The following is a list of songs named "Breathe":
 "Breathe" (Blu Cantrell song), featuring Sean Paul (2003)
 "Breathe" (CamelPhat and Christoph song) (2018)
 "Breathe" (Delilah song), (2012)
 "Breathe" (Erasure song), (2005)
 "Breathe" (Fabolous song), (2004)
 "Breathe" (Faith Hill song), (1999)
 "Breathe" (Jax Jones song), featuring Ina Wroldsen (2017)
 "Breathe" (Kaz James song), featuring Stu Stone (2008)
 "Breathe" (Kylie Minogue song), (1998)
 "Breathe" (Michelle Branch song), (2003)
 "Breathe" (Midge Ure song), (1996)
 "Breathe" (Moist song), (1999)
 "Breathe" (Nickelback song), (2000)
 "Breathe" (Pink Floyd song), (1973)
 "Breathe (Reprise)", a reprise of the above song, found as the closing section of "Time"
 "Breathe" (The Prodigy song), (1996)
 "Breathe" (Ricki-Lee Coulter song), (2006)
 "Breathe" (Seeb song), featuring Neev (2016)
 "Breathe" (Taylor Swift song), featuring Colbie Caillat (2008)
 "Breathe" (Télépopmusiksong), (2001)
 "Breathe" (U2 song), (2009)
 "Breathe" (Vladana song), (2022)
 "Breathe" (Winterville song)", (2006)
 "Breathe (2 AM)", by Anna Nalick (2005)
 "Breathe", by Alexi Murdoch from the album Time Without Consequence (2006)
 "Breathe", by Angels & Airwaves from the album I-Empire (2007)
 "Breathe", by Backstreet Boys from the album In a World Like This (2013)
 "Breathe", by Backstreet Boys from the album DNA (2019)
 "Breathe", by Basement from the album Colourmeinkindness (2012)
 "Breathe (Spontaneous)", by Bethel Music and Amanda Cook, from the album Starlight (2017)
 "Breathe", by BoDeans, from the album Still (2008)
 "Breathe", by Bon Jovi from their box set 100,000,000 Bon Jovi Fans Can't Be Wrong (2004)
 "Breathe", by Breathe featuring Natalie Mejia (2009)
 "Breathe", by Collective Soul from the album Hints Allegations and Things Left Unsaid (1994)
 "Breathe", by The Cult from the album Beyond Good and Evil (album) (2001)
 "Breathe", by Depeche Mode from their album Exciter (2001)
 "Breathe", by Dev from the album The Night the Sun Came Up (2012)
 "Breathe", by Disturbed from the album Believe (2002)
 "Breathe", by Eric Prydz featuring Rob Swire from Prydz's album Opus (2016)
 "Breathe", by G-Dragon from the album Heartbreaker (2009)
 "Breathe", by Iyaz from the album Replay (2010)
 "Breathe", by Keller Williams and The String Cheese Incident from the album Breathe (1999)
 "Breathe", by Kittie from the album Funeral for Yesterday (2007)
 "Breathe", by Lalah Hathaway from the album Self Portrait (2008)
 "Breathe", by Leaves from the album Breathe (2002)
 "Breathe", by Little Mix from the album Confetti, 2020 
 "Breathe", by Luna Sea from the album Shine (1998)
 "Breathe", by Greenwheel from the album Soma Holiday (2002)
 "Breathe", covered by Melissa Etheridge from the album Lucky (2004)
 "Breathe", by Jeremy Camp from the album Restored (2004)
 "Breathe", by Mackenzie Ziegler (2017)
 "Breathe", by Matt Brouwer from Imagerical (2001)
 "Breathe", by Michael W. Smith from the album Worship (2001)
 "Breathe", by Mike Peters from the album Breathe (1994)
 "Breathe", by Ministry from the album The Mind Is a Terrible Thing to Taste (1989)
 "Breathe", by Miss A from the album A Class (2010)
 "Breathe", by Newsboys, from the album Take Me to Your Leader (1996)
 "Breathe", by Rebecca St. James from the album Worship God (2002)
 "Breathe", by Roger Waters from the album Music from The Body
 "Breathe", by Roxette from the album The Ballad Hits (2003)
 "Breathe", by Ryan Star from the album 11:59 (2010)
 "Breathe", by Seinabo Sey from the album I'm a Dream (2018)
 "Breathe", by Sugar Ray from the album Floored (1997)
 "Breathe", by Swollen Members featuring Nelly Furtado from the album Monsters in the Closet (2002)
 "Breathe", by Taproot from the album Welcome (2002)
 "Breathe", by Tara Blaise from the album Great Escape
 "Breathe", by Toploader from the album Onka's Big Moka (2000)
 "Breathe", by Two of Cups (2009)
 "Breathe (Respira)", from the musical In the Heights

See also
 "Breathe and Stop", the second single released by Q-Tip
 Breathe (disambiguation)
 Breathing (disambiguation)
 Breath (disambiguation)
 Exhale (disambiguation)